Kwon Jung Ho, also stylised as kwonjungho and Kwon Jungho, is a Korean artist, sculptor, and educator based in Daegu, South Korea. Kwon was influenced by Abstract Expressionism, Neo-Expressionism, and Post-Modernism movements. A majority of artworks in the oeuvre take the shape of the skeleton that reflects the artist's interest in the subject matters of life and death inspired by his physician father from a childhood memory. The pivotal artworks consist of monochrome paintings, dot series, sound series, skeleton series that embrace flat painting and installation, and conception and abstraction.

Life and Education 
The son of a physician, Kwon Jung Ho was born in Chilgok, located in Gyeongsangbuk-do Province, on April 28, 1944. Kwon, born on the verge of the Korea's liberation, grew up in times of social turmoil. In 1950, he enrolled at Suchang Elementary School, but the same year, he fled to Miryang (Yeonjeong) for refuge to escape the Korean War. After graduating from Jongno National School in 1956, from 1959 to 1963, he attended Gyeseong High School where he learned photography from the photography class taught by Kim Tae Han and Her Jong Jeong; nevertheless, Kwon did not aspire to become an artist at that time. After being rejected by a medical college, he entered the Civil and Architecture department at Chunggu University in 1964 for its high value on socially useful work. However, in 1965, Kwon transferred to the Arts and Crafts department at Keimyung University to pursue studies as an art student. He attended lectures by sculptor Nam Chul, craftsman Kim Gwang-Hyun, and painter Seo Seok Gyu. In 1972, Kwon became an apprentice of Professor Jung Joem Sik and calligrapher Seo Dong Gyun who greatly influenced his early works, and the same year, Kwon graduated from the university. In 1975, he married his current wife and had one child. After completing the master's degree in Art Education at Keimyung University from 1973 to 1982, he moved to New York to further his studies in Fine Art at the Pratt Institute, where he obtained a master's degree under the tutelage of Professor Corinne Robbins and Kelvin Albert from 1983 to 1986.

Career 
In 1972, Kwon embarked on his career as an art educator at Gyeongan Middle School in Andong, Oseong High School in Daegu, and Gyeongmyeong Girls' Middle School. With his career background as a lecturer at Hyosung Women's University, Keimyung College, Hansa Technical College, and Shinil College, in 1982, Kwon was appointed as a professor at Daegu University where he worked until 2009. From 1996 to 1999, he served as the president of the Korean Art Association of Daegu Metropolitan City, the vice-president of the Korean Art Association, and the national branch president. In 1997, Kwon and 24 other members who endorsed the local art, academia, press, and cultural community reinforced the Daegu Art Museum construction committee's establishment by implementing a petition and fundraising exhibition to support the museum establishment. From 2002 to 2006, he served as the president of the Korea Federation of Art and Culture Association of Daegu Metropolitan. To this day, Kwon continues to work as a prominent arts administrator and artist.

Art

From the 1970s to 1980s 

After completing his military service in 1969, Kwon returned to school with a great interest in abstract art. In the early 1970s, he started his career as an artist at the Cungmok-Hoe founded in 1971, Ijjip-Hoe, and Sinjo-Hoe. Influenced by his mentor Professor Jung Jeon Sik and sculptor Nam Gwan, Kwon mostly created abstract works consist of characters and dots. During this period, he was exposed to artworks by popular foreign artists such as Duchamp and Jasper Jones in Japanese and American magazines and books brought in by the USIS. Amidst the tumultuous years of the inflow of new culture, Kwon also endeavored to discover the essence of art. He created the dots series by drawing and attaching dots in the shapes of holes on changhoji, traditional Korean paper used for doors and windows. In the later period, Kwon stated that his life and culture inspired the dots in his early works. During earlier periods, his interest in Informal abstraction shifted to characters for form and then dots, lines, and planes. In the 1980s, he attempted a conceptual approach towards his artistic practice. As the first attempt, Kwon created 'A Fool's Plastering' in 1981 that embodies the criticism for the absence of history and conceptual meaning in the Korean contemporary art in which the Western art trends prevalently influenced the minimal and monochrome painting styles.

From the 1980s to 1990s 
When Neo-Expressionism and Post-Modernism emerged in the 1980s as powerful movements after Abstract Expressionism, Kwon explored his cultural background and sought the legitimacy of his work. He developed the research on the connection of visceral expression with the oriental spirit rather than a meticulous depiction. Inspired by a discarded speaker on the street, he created sound series that encompassed his reality, and restless and exhausted modern people expressed through the speaker-formed object, quick brushstrokes, and vivid primary colors.

In the late 1980s, his work extended from the sound to the skeleton, which was initially used to reveal repugnance toward social inhibition. Kwon created works deeply infused with social malaise and agony in the ordeals of a tumultuous period during the war and transitional society based on the subjects matters of 'incident,' 'night,' 'anger,' 'fear,' and 'death.' In the 1990s, he developed his style of expression by employing bold colors and intense lines.

From the 1990s to 2000s 

In the 1990s, Kwon began to use lines as a distinct expression measure in his works. During this time, the skeleton was depicted with disassembled lines that capture the stream of emotion, consciousness, and energy. The line series Kwon created in the mid-1990s consisted of dynamic streams of lines and a remarkable brushstroke of the line stretched beyond its mere appearance as a line. The lines in his later works demonstrated his attempt to recognize and express cultural identity. In the 2000s, Kwon often used lines that engage objective expressions like figures, everyday scenes, still life, and landscape.

From the 2000s to 2010s 
The real-life events influenced Kwon's works in the 2000s. His concern for social issues since his time abroad profoundly enriched and manifested onto the canvas upon the 'Sangin gas explosion' in Daegu in 1995. During this time, he created simple and abstract lines that involve the narratives of the solitude of everyday life infused in public places like the train station, airport, and central city in Daegu, where people gather to take a trip.

Kwon himself was utterly devastated when he lost friends and his disciples from the '2.18 Daegu subway accident' in 2003. He was determined to create 'subway series' to keep a social testimony and record of the incident through his work. In the series, Kwon recorded the disastrous accident scene, infuriated the public, responsible people, the protest, and religion in memorial. He devised and incorporated the paper to contemplate the true image of the accident. Through his careful observation and empathy, Kwon envisioned revealing the reality of society and convey consolation to the local community in distress. Later, he expanded his concerns to social problems such as a rise in the unemployment rate and overflowing individualism. 

In the extension of these concerns, <Gate through the future> was presented in 2013 and Hong Soon Whan, director of Kunstdoc Gallery, described the work as such:

"Kwon has made more than 2300 Dakpaper skulls. Repetition of formation based on handcraft has important meaning that it reminds of process and cycle of death. It is repeated endlessly, but it is just describing the form of death related to the world as an image, not trying to explain the death itself or to supplement the loss of subject. It repeats existential questions repeatedly. So this process of making skulls through complicate process creates skull as an image of death, but the image itself is not a goal but just a kind of carrying out of consideration on existence."

Exhibitions 

2019
 Kwon Jeong-ho retrospect Exhibition(1971-2018), Art &culture Center,no.1.2 ,Daegu
 1985 NY, Artcenter of Bongsan, Daegu
 Kwon Jeong-ho, Shirota gallery, Tokyo, Japan
2017
 Kwon Jeong-ho, Koskun "The noble space and noble flow", Suseong Artpia, Daegu
2015
 KWON JUNG-HO "GokSin", O'sGallery, Wanjoo
2014
 KWON JUNG-HO Photo Show "Shifted Time",DAEGU PHOTO BIENNALE, SPACE129, Daegu
2013
 KWON JUNG-HO "The Mirror of Death Shining on a Life", Cyan Museum, Youngchun
 Invited show of KWON JUNG-HO, Gallery KUNSTDOC, Seoul
 Invited show of KWON JUNG-HO, Gallery SOHEON,CONTEMPORY, Daegu

2020
 Made in Daegu II, Daegu Art Museum, Daegu
 Summon Memorry, Suseoung Artpia, Daegu
2019
 Mediacity, Yangpyeong Museum of Art, Yangpyeong
 Start-up, Suseuong Artpia, Daegu
2018		
 Fire Art Festival 2018 Pyeongchang Culture Olympics, Korea Culture and Arts Committee, Gangneung
 Daegu self-portrait of contemporary art (21st anniversary since 1997), midsummer night party, Daegu Culture and Arts Center, Daegu
 The 34th South Korea International Contemporary Art Festival - From Agglomeration to Momentum, Gallery Joy, Busan
 Daegu Catholic Artists Rotate, De Mans Gallery, Daegu
2017		
 Sea Art Festival, Busan Biennale, Busan
 Daegu's body, Daegu Culture and Arts Center, Daegu
 Looking at the flow of contemporary art, Yeosu Expo Art Gallery, Yeosu
 Barcode, Yangpyeong Art Museum, Yangpyeong
2016	     	
 Daegu contemporary art, Daegu art & cultural center, Daegu
 Life Painting Artist, Daegu art & cultural center, Daegu
 O, DokBulZangGun, Ujong Museum of art, Bosung
2015
 ICAPU "Between"_ Empty house project, Ulsan Cultural Street, Ulsan 
2014		
 Daegu Contempory Art Festival-"From Kyungshanggamyeung To Jongno", Daegu Cultural Art Center Museum, Daegu
 CMCP_Collective Memory Collective Power, Bongsan Art Center, Daegu
2013	
 Daegu Contempory Art Festival, Power Plant of Creation, Daegu
 Fashion with Pattern, 63Sky Art Museum, Seoul
2012	
 Daegu Culture Award- Invitation Exhibit of Prizewinner, Daegu Culture & Art Center, Daegu
2011	
 KIAF/11-Mirror of time& The gate through Future, Gallery Soheon, COEX, Seoul
 Light and Spirit of Daegu Art-Now in Daegu, Daegu
 Invited show of KANG, IK JOONG KWON, JUNG HO JHEON SOO CHEON, Soosung Artphia, Gallery Hoban, Media Holl, Daegu
 Daegu Art Museum Opening 2nd Tema Exhibition(Life & Culture), Daegu Art Museum, Daegu
2010	
 Korean Doyen Artists Invitation Exhibit-Korea Art Festival 2010, KINTEX, Ilsan
 Daegu Art Fair 2010, Daegu EXCO, Daegu

Collections

In Korea
 Busan Museum of Art, Busan
 Bulgwangsa, Seoul
 Chuncheon Animation Museum, Chuncheon
 College of Health Sciences, Daegu
 Cyan Museum of Art, Yongcheon
 Daegu Art Museum, Daegu
 Daegu City Hall, Daegu
 Daegu Culture and Arts Center, Daegu
 Daegu Opera House, Daegu
 Daegu Plaza Department Store, Daegu
 Daegu University Museum, Daegu
 E-gallery, Wanjoo
 Kim Daegun Cathedral, Daegu
 O's gallery, Wanjoo
 National Museum of Contemporary Art, Seoul
 Museum of Korean Buddhist Art, Seoul

Overseas
 Murray State University, Murray, USA
 Shanghai City Hall, Shanghai, China

References

External links 
 Kwon Jung Ho 
 YouTube : Kwon Jung Ho

Abstract expressionist artists
Neo-expressionist artists
South Korean contemporary artists
South Korean painters
South Korean sculptors
Living people
1944 births